Faile may refer to:

FAILE (artist collaboration), American artistic collaboration
Faile Bashere, a fictional character in The Wheel of Time
Tommy Faile (1928–1998), American singer songwriter
Edward G. Faile, a 19th-century tea and sugar importer

See also
Failetown, Alabama